The Kia Ray is a city car manufactured by Kia exclusively for the South Korean domestic market. Based on the Kia Picanto/Morning, it was specifically developed in compliance with the "light car" category that offers tax incentives for cars with exterior dimensions below  in length and below  in width.

Overview
Only available in the local Korean domestic market, the Kia Ray is equipped with a 998cc gasoline engine which generates  at 6,400 rpm.

The Ray has a unique door layout; the passenger side of the vehicle has a sliding door for the rear seats, while the driver's side has a swing-out door. The car has a kei car-inspired boxy dimensions. The Ray's interior benefits from the square shape, as it has more space than most cars its size; however, it is only able to seat four people.

Kia Ray EV 
The Kia Ray EV was launched in 2011 as Kia's first production battery electric vehicle. It is powered by a  electric motor, with a 16.4 kWh lithium ion battery that allows an all-electric range of  depending on driving conditions.

The initial roll out was a limited production of 2,500 units destined for the South Korean government fleets, and scheduled to be deployed in 2012. The service had 15,000 registered customers by May 2013.

2017 Facelift
The New Ray, which received a facelift, was released on December 13, 2017. The radiator grille in the center of the existing model was raised to the same height as the headlamp and changed to body color. Wide honeycomb patterns were also applied to tailgate garnish.

The sudden braking alarm system was applied to all trims, and rollover detection was added to the existing six airbags. It is designed to add four-point colors and license plate LED lamps to loops, outer mirror covers, and radiator grills from three popular body colors, Milky Beige, Clear White, and Aurora Black Pearls. 

A single-seater Kia Ray Van was released on February 8, 2022. It operates with a total of two trims, Prestige and Prestige Special. Driver convenience specifications such as a driver's heating wire seat and a driver's seat height adjustment device are added to the Prestige Special.

2022 Facelift 
The New Kia Ray, which received a second facelift, was unveiled on August 10, 2022 and released on September 1st.  On the front, Starmap signature lighting and center garnish are placed horizontally. The bumper has a flat, angular design. The skid plate was applied to the lower part of the bumper. A 15-inch alloy wheel with a geometric shape is applied to the side. On the rear, a rear combination lamp was applied, and Starmap signature lighting was placed on the edge of the rear combination lamp. In addition, an additional non-exposed tailgate handle was applied. A 4.2-inch LCD cluster design was applied to the interior, and a light gray interior was added.

Driver assistance system and convenience features such as Rear Cross-Traffic Collision-Avoidance Assist, Safe Exit Warning, ventilated driver's seat, air-purification mode are also applied.

On November 17, 2022, Gravity, the design differentiation model of The New Kia Ray, was added. Gravity is based on Ray's top trim signature and applies new design elements to create a tough-looking exterior. The dark metal front center garnish and rear tailgate garnish give a solid impression, and black colors are applied to the front and rear skid plates, A-pillars, roof, and exterior mirrors to create a sophisticated atmosphere. On the sides, 15-inch black alloy wheels are applied.

References

External links

2010s cars
Production electric cars
City cars
Hatchbacks
Front-wheel-drive vehicles
Ray
Cars introduced in 2012